Boyfriend Dungeon is a dungeon crawler-dating sim developed and published by Kitfox Games. Taking place in an urban fantasy setting, the player character must fight through dungeons with the help of a human partner who can transform into a sentient weapon. Outside of dungeons, the player can date their partner in visual novel-style sequences that increase their power in combat. It was released for the Nintendo Switch, Xbox One, and Microsoft Windows on August 11, 2021, followed by a PlayStation 5 version on February 14, 2023.

Gameplay 
The game's combat takes place in real time from an isometric perspective. The player can perform different combos depending on their weapon. Outside of combat, there are visual novel-style dating sequences that allow the player to choose their responses.

Plot 
The main character, whose gender is selectable, lives in Verona Beach, a city in a contemporary fantasy world where monsters pose a danger to people. The player fights in dungeons, known as "dunj" in the world's slang, using weapons created from transformed humans or other creatures. The weapons can be dated to increase their power, although the game also contains a "platonic" relationship with a cat. The personalities of the weapon characters are based on their weapon type.

Development 
The game was funded via Kickstarter, where it raised $272,000 and surpassed its goal. One of its characters, Rowan, was designed by the artist of Hatoful Boyfriend. The developers stated that they wanted to make the romance elements "as inclusive as possible" and therefore allow players to date women and non-binary characters, despite the game's title.

Kitfox tried to avoid making the protagonist a self-insert character, and focused on adding "fears and desires and an arc" to make the main character more of a character.

On September 10, 2020, it was announced that the game would be delayed to 2021 to protect the developers' mental health. Additionally, some content was cut from the game so that it would be released "at a time that isn't like... 2025".

Reception 

Boyfriend Dungeon received "mixed or average" reviews, according to review aggregator Metacritic.

GamesRadar+ stated that "the game feels perfectly weighted to suit those who love either genre, yet doesn't alienate new players". PCGamesN called it "an intriguing curio". IGN gave the game a mixed review, saying that "Boyfriend Dungeon offers a fun spin on the dating sim formula, but its roguelite parts don't always mix well with developing romance."

Boyfriend Dungeon was nominated for the Games for Impact category for The Game Awards 2021.

References 

Dungeon crawler video games
Dating sims
Kickstarter-funded video games
Indie video games
2021 video games
LGBT-related video games
Video games about shapeshifting
Video games developed in Canada
Windows games
Nintendo Switch games
Xbox One games
PlayStation 5 games
Single-player video games
Urban fantasy video games
Transgender-related video games
Game Developers Choice Award winners
Kitfox Games games